Herringbone, also called broken twill weave, describes a distinctive V-shaped weaving pattern usually found in twill fabric.  It is distinguished from a plain chevron by the break at reversal, which makes it resemble a broken zigzag. The pattern is called herringbone because it resembles the skeleton of a herring fish. Herringbone-patterned fabric is usually wool, and is one of the most popular cloths used for suits and outerwear. Tweed cloth is often woven with a herringbone pattern.

Fatigue uniforms made from cotton in this weave were used by several militaries during and after World War II; in US use, they were often called HBTs.

History 
Various herringbone weaves have been found in antiquity:

 A pair of woolen leggings found in the permafrost of the Italian-Austrian Alps have a 2:2 herringbone weave, dating to 800 to 500 BC.
 A dark blue cloth with a 2:2 herringbone weave was found at Murabba'at Cave in Israel, from the Roman period.
 A textile with a 2:2 herringbone weave was found at Pompeii, from 79 AD.
 An illustration of a cloth having a herringbone weave from Antinoöpolis in Greece from 130 AD.
 The Falkirk Tartan, a wool 2:2 herringbone tartan found at Vindolanda in England from around 240 AD.

See also 
Herringbone pattern

References

Textile patterns